Bård Finne (born 13 February 1995) is a Norwegian professional footballer who plays as a forward for SK Brann. 

Hailing from Bergen, he started his professional career in Brann. Finne has represented Norway from under-15 to under-21 level.

Club career

Brann
Finne was born in Bergen, with parents hailing from Voss. During his childhood, Finne participated in both athletics and cross-country skiing in addition to playing football and became regional champion in cross-country skiing while competing for Voss IL. Finne, who grew up in the area surrounding Brann Stadion, played football for SK Trane until he gave up both athletics and skiing at the age of 12 and joined Nymark IL where he played with Andreas Vindheim and Kasper Skaanes until the three joined SK Brann's youth-team together in 2009.

Before he signed a professional contract with Brann, he was eligible to play in Tippeligaen as he was listed on the team's B-list. He was wanted by Dutch club NEC Nijmegen and Ole Gunnar Solskjær's club Molde, but Finne signed a professional contract for Brann in September 2012. He scored his first two goals in Tippeligaen in the match against rivaling club Rosenborg on 23 September 2012. He made five appearances and scored three goals in the 2012 season, after which he gained the nickname "the fox in the box".

Finne's first appearance of the 2013 season, came when he replaced Kristoffer Barmen as a substitute against Lillestrøm in April 2013. In the First Round of the 2013 Norwegian Football Cup, Finne scored four goals when Brann won 14–0 against Hovding. In June 2013, Finne rejected Brann's offer for a new contract and stated that he wanted to move abroad either during the summer or when his contract expired after the season. The crowd at Brann Stadion did not like that Finne wanted to leave the club, and booed at him when he replaced Martin Pusic in the home match against Sandnes Ulf on 29 June 2013, but Finne answered by scoring a hat-trick in the 6–1 victory.

Cologne
On 20 August 2013, it was announced that he had signed a 3.5-year contract with the 2. Bundesliga side 1. FC Köln starting in January 2014. He joined the club as a Bosman player as his contract with Brann expired on 31 December 2013. He debuted for 1. FC Köln on 9 February in the 2. Bundesliga tie against SC Paderborn at the RheinEnergie Stadion (final result 0–1) entering the pitch as a substitute for Anthony Ujah in the 46th minute.

Heidenheim
He moved to 1. FC Heidenheim on 16 January 2016. Finne played 24 games for the club and scored 3 goals.

Vålerenga
On 24 February 2017, Finne signed a four-year contract with Brann rivals Vålerenga, despite his agent stating that he would never play for another Norwegian club. On 3 April he scored the only goal in a 1–0 win on his competitive debut for Vålerenga against Viking.

SønderjyskE
On 10 October 2020 Danish Superliga club SønderjyskE confirmed, that Finne would join the club from 2021 on a deal until June 2024.

Return to Brann
On 5 August 2021, Finne returned to Norway and signed a deal until June 2025 with his former club SK Brann. He became the top scorer in the 2022 Norwegian First Division with 16 goals, alongside Gift Orban.

International career
Finne first represented Norway when he played two matches for the under-15 team against Sweden U15 in September 2010. The next month he was selected for the squad that met Portugal, France and Netherlands in an under-15 tournament. He played a total of five matches for the under-15 team in 2010. The next year he played 11 matches for the under-16 team, scoring five goals. In 2012, he played 11 matches and scored four goals for the under-17 team in addition to 11 matches and three goals for the under-18 team. He made his debut for the under-19 team in 2013, and scored goals against Netherlands U19 and Cyprus U19 in the elite qualification for the 2013 UEFA European Under-19 Football Championship.

Career statistics

Honours
Individual
Norwegian First Division top scorer: 2022

References

External links
 Profile at Brann.no 

1995 births
Living people
Footballers from Bergen
Norwegian footballers
Norway under-21 international footballers
Norway youth international footballers
Association football forwards
SK Brann players
1. FC Köln players
1. FC Köln II players
1. FC Heidenheim players
Vålerenga Fotball players
SønderjyskE Fodbold players
Norwegian Second Division players
Eliteserien players
Bundesliga players
2. Bundesliga players
Danish Superliga players
Norwegian expatriate footballers
Expatriate footballers in Germany
Expatriate men's footballers in Denmark
Norwegian expatriate sportspeople in Germany
Norwegian expatriate sportspeople in Denmark